Drillia patriciae is a species of sea snail, a marine gastropod mollusk in the family Drilliidae.

Description
The size of an adult shell varies between 25 mm and 30 mm.

Distribution
This species occurs in the demersal zone of the Atlantic Ocean off Gabon at depths between 20 mm and 50 m.

References

 Bernard, P.A. (Ed.) (1984). Coquillages du Gabon [Shells of Gabon]. Pierre A. Bernard: Libreville, Gabon. 140, 75 plates pp.
  Tucker, J.K. 2004 Catalog of recent and fossil turrids (Mollusca: Gastropoda). Zootaxa 682:1–1295

External links
 
 Holotype at MNHN, Paris

Endemic fauna of Gabon
patriciae
Gastropods described in 1984